Nandasiri may refer to:

Nandasiri Jasentuliyana, Sri Lankan lawyer
Sanath Nandasiri (born 1942), Sri Lankan classical musician
Vijaya Nandasiri (1944 or 1947 – 2016), Sri Lankan dramatist and actor

Sinhalese surnames
Sinhalese masculine given names